James Clark (September 21, 1927 – October 24, 1990) was a Major League Baseball player who played in nine games for the Washington Senators in . He was used as a pinch hitter in seven of his nine games.

External links

http://www.baseball-almanac.com/players/player.php?p=clarkji02

1927 births
1990 deaths
Washington Senators (1901–1960) players
Baseball players from Pennsylvania
Bakersfield Bears players
Buffalo Bisons (minor league) players
Chattanooga Lookouts players
Columbus Cardinals players
Danville Leafs players
Fort Worth Cats players
Hamilton Cardinals players
Indianapolis Indians players
Johnson City Cardinals players
Miami Beach Flamingos players
Modesto Reds players
Montgomery Rebels players
Montreal Royals players
American expatriate baseball players in Canada
New Orleans Pelicans (baseball) players
Oklahoma City Indians players
San Antonio Missions players
St. Paul Saints (AA) players
Vancouver Capilanos players
Victoria Athletics players
Victoria Tyees players
Winston-Salem Cardinals players